The al-Kabri incident, or Al-Kabri massacre, refers to a military operation carried out by the Israeli army during the 1948 Arab–Israeli War in retaliation for the ambush of the Yehiam convoy. On May 20, 1948, the Israeli Carmeli Brigade captured al-Kabri, a Palestinian Arab village in the northwest corner of the region of the British Mandate of Palestine that was later incorporated into the State of Israel. On March 27, 1948, hundreds of armed villagers and units of the Arab Liberation Army attacked a Jewish convoy near the village, killing forty-nine Jews.  Six Arabs were also killed in the battle.  Two months later the commander of Operation Ben-Ami gave operational orders given that day were to "attack with the aim of capturing, the villages of Kabri, Umm al Faraj and Al-Nahr, to kill the men [and] to destroy and set fire to the villages." Benvenisti states that "the orders were carried out to the letter", while Morris writes that a number of villagers were apparently executed.

Al-Kabri was captured without any resistance and it was almost immediately depopulated. It was treated particularly harshly due to the villagers involvement with the destruction of the Jewish convoy. According to Walid Khalidi, an 'undisclosed number of villagers were taken prisoner and some were killed' and others were killed during their dispersal in Galilee when it was discovered that they had come from al-Kabri.

Published Accounts of the Incident
Dov Yirmiya, who took part in the operation, reported:
Kabri was conquered without a fight. Almost all inhabitants fled. One of the soldiers, Yehuda Reshef, who was together with his brother among the few escapees from the Yehi’am  convoy,  got  hold  of  a  few  youngsters  who did not escape, probably seven, ordered them to fill up some ditches dug as an obstacle and then lined them up and  fired  at  them  with  a  machine  gun.  A few died but some of the wounded succeeded to escape.

Aminah Muhammad Musa, a female refugee from al-Kabri, reported:
My husband and I left Kabri the day before it fell... At dawn [the next day], while my husband was preparing for his morning prayer, our friend Raja passed us and urged us to proceed, saying that we should run... It was not too long before we were met by the Jews... They took us and a few other villagers... in an armoured car back to the village. There a Jewish officer interrogated us and, putting a gun to my husband's neck, he said "You are from Kabri?"... The Jews took away my husband, Ibrahim Dabajah, Hussain Hassan al-Khubaizah, Khalil al-Tamlawi, Uthman Iban As'ad Mahmud, and Raja. They left the rest of us... An officer came to me and asked me not to cry. We slept in the village orchards that night. The next morning, Umm Hussain and I went to the village... I saw Umm Taha on the way to the village courtyard. She cried and said "You had better go see your dead husband." I found him. He was shot in the back of the head.

References

Bibliography

  
 

  

1948 massacres of Palestinians
Mass murder in 1948
Massacres in Israel during the Israeli–Palestinian conflict
Massacres of men
Violence against men in Asia